Dilip Babasaheb Bhosale (born 24 October 1956) is the ex-Judicial Member of Lokpal Committee. He is the former Chief Justice of the Allahabad High Court. He has also served as Acting Chief Justice of Hyderabad High Court and as a Judge of Hyderabad High Court, Karnataka High Court and Bombay High Court.

Background
Bhosale hails from Satara district of Maharashtra. He comes from a prominent family. His father Babasaheb Bhosale was the Chief Minister of Maharashtra from 1982 to 83 while his uncle Shivajirao was the Vice-Chancellor of Marathwada University situated at Aurangabad. Justice Bhosale studied law at Government Law College, Mumbai.

Career
He joined the Bar in June 1980 when he began practice at the High Court of Bombay. Bhosale was an Assistant Government Pleader and Assistant Public Prosecutor at the court from 1986 to 1991. He was appointed an Additional Judge at the Bombay High Court in January 2001 and promoted to be a Permanent Judge two years later. Beginning 2012, Bhosale was made a sitting Judge at the High Court of Karnataka.
On 30 July 2016, he was promoted to Chief Justice of Allahabad High Court. 
On 23 October 2018, he retired from High Court.

Notable judgements
 A division bench consisting of Bhosale and Justice Yashwant Varma ruled that the Election Commission of India has powers to remove duplicate and fake names from the electoral rolls till the last date of filing the nominations.

References

1956 births
21st-century Indian judges
Chief Justices of the Allahabad High Court
Judges of the Andhra Pradesh High Court
Judges of the Karnataka High Court
Judges of the Bombay High Court
Living people
University of Mumbai alumni
20th-century Indian lawyers